Holt railway station, opened in 1987, is the current terminus of the North Norfolk Railway and is a new-build station half a mile south of the proposed, but never built, Blakeney branch junction.

The station building once belonged to Stalham railway station, but was moved and reconstructed on site. The current station is located just under a mile away from the site of the original Holt railway station, which had been closed in 1964 by British Railways.

William Marriott Museum
The William Marriott Museum is located in the goods shed at the station. Operated by the Midland and Great Northern Joint Railway Society, the museum features railroad artefacts and memorabilia, as well as historic buildings, locomotives, rolling stock and a historic signalling system.  The museum is open on days when the North Norfolk Railway is operating.

Miniature railway
For around 16 years, the Holt station included a miniature railway operated by the North Norfolk Model Railway Club.  In 2019, the miniature line was forced to close due to plans to redevelop the part of the site that they occupied.  In 2020, it was announced that the miniature line would be rebuilt at County School on the neighbouring Mid-Norfolk Railway.

Location
The station is around a mile from Holt town centre; it also has a large car park.

References

External links
 William Marriott Museum - Midland and Great Northern Joint Railway Society

Heritage railway stations in Norfolk
Museums in Norfolk
Railway museums in England
Railway stations in Great Britain opened in 1987
Railway stations built for UK heritage railways
Holt, Norfolk